Michele Foglia (born 30 January 1998) is an Italian footballer who plays as a midfielder for Chieri.

Career

Arezzo
In January 2020, Foglia moved to Arezzo of Serie C.

Serie D
On 15 January 2021, he joined Serie D club Atletico Terme Fiuggi. In July 2021, he then moved to Chieri.

References

External links
Michele Foglia at Soccerbase

1998 births
Living people
F.C. Pro Vercelli 1892 players
S.S. Arezzo players
Serie C players
Serie D players
Italian footballers
Association football midfielders
Footballers from Milan